Chris Trickle (May 30, 1972 – March 25, 1998) was an American stock car racing driver. A competitor in the NASCAR Featherlite Southwest Tour, he was murdered in a drive-by shooting that remains unsolved.

Family
Trickle was the son of Chuck and Barbara Trickle, and nephew of NASCAR driver Dick Trickle. Trickle was also the father of twins Joelyn Hope and Cole Trickle Miele. Joelyn and Cole were born on April 23, 2001. Their birth was the product of in vitro fertilization.

Racing career

Trickle began racing in motorcycles when he was eight years old. He had two track championships by the time he was fifteen. He then drove in a national touring series.

Trickle turned to stock cars in 1990. He was the 1992 Rookie of the Year in late models at the 3/8 mile track at Las Vegas Speedway Park. He finished third in the season points with 3 wins in 18 events.

He had 10 wins, 14 poles, and 12 Top-10 finished in 23 events and finished second in the 1993 Southern California Sportsman Series (late models).

In 1994, Trickle had 8 wins, 20 poles, and 18 Top-10 finishes in 29 races in his late model.

In 1995, he competed at two levels. He had 16 wins and 24 poles in 32 races in his late model. He also competed in 13 races in the NASCAR AutoZone Elite Division, Southwest Series (Southwest Series), and he had one pole and one Top-10 finish.

In 1996, he competed exclusively in the Southwest Series, winning one race and finishing in the top 10 nine times; he also attempted to qualify for Craftsman Truck Series events at Phoenix International Raceway and Las Vegas Motor Speedway.

Trickle gained national attention while appearing on the NASCAR Winter Heat series on TNN and ESPN2. He raced in late models, the NASCAR AutoZone Elite Division, Southwest Series, and NASCAR Grand National Division, West Series during the series. He competed in the No. 70 car.

Trickle was scheduled to join the NASCAR Craftsman Truck Series in 1997.

Death

On February 9, 1997, Trickle left his home in Las Vegas around 9 p.m. to play tennis with a friend at a lighted court. As he drove over the freeway, a car drove alongside and fired shots into his car hitting him in the head.

Trickle died from complications of his wounds on March 25, 1998, 409 days after the shooting. At the time of the shooting, Nevada law limited murder prosecution to one year and one day. Trickle's death from his wounds thus occurred after the prosecution time limit. In 1999, Nevada passed a law (called the "Chris Trickle bill") which removed the time limit on prosecution for murder charges. Trickle's murder remains unsolved, and was featured twice on America's Most Wanted.

His father Chuck returned to racing afterwards and became the 2003 Super Late Model Champion at The Bullring at Las Vegas Motor Speedway, but no longer actively races. His brother's two sons, Tommy and another Chris (named in his memory) are also racers who compete the Bullring in Las Vegas. Trickle was succeeded in the Star Nursery team's Southwest Tour car by Kurt Busch, who won the 1999 Southwest Tour Championship with the team.

See also
 List of unsolved murders

Motorsports career results

NASCAR
(key) (Bold – Pole position awarded by qualifying time. Italics – Pole position earned by points standings or practice time. * – Most laps led.)

Craftsman Truck Series

References

External links
 
 Chris Trickle at TheThirdTurn

1972 births
1998 deaths
1998 murders in the United States
20th-century American people
Deaths by firearm in Nevada
Male murder victims
NASCAR drivers
People murdered in Nevada
Racing drivers from Las Vegas
Racing drivers from Nevada
Sportspeople from the Las Vegas Valley
Unsolved murders in the United States